Nur al-Dīn al-Sālimī (full name Nur al-Dīn Abū Muḥammad ʿAbd Allāh ibn Ḥumayd ibn Sullūm al-Sālimī, c. 1286-1332 AH/1869-1914 CE) was an Omani historian and scholar noted for his expertise in Ibāḍī Islam.

Biography

Al-Sālimī was born near Rustaq, in al-Ḥawqayn, and was at first educated mainly by his father, followed by tuition by various Omani scholars, gaining particular expertise in Ibāḍī Islam. Around the age of twelve he became blind.

Al-Sālimī's life was characterised by his work to re-establish the Imamate of Oman, which had been replaced under British imperial influence by the Albusaidi Sultans of Muscat. Al-Sālimī's teachers included men who had secured the election of Oman's only Imām of the nineteenth century, ʿAzzān ibn Qays (reigned 1868–71). His early life near Rustaq positioned him at the centre of Ibāḍī resistance to the Sultanate. As the focus of this activism shifted to the province of Sharqiyya, al-Sālimī moved to that region, between around 1886 and 1890. There he studied with Sheikh Sāliḥ ibn ʿAli al-Ḥārithī (1834–96), and, with the support of al-Ḥārithī, settled and began to teach in the village of al-Qābil.

However, Sāliḥ's son, ʿĪsā ibn Ṣāliḥ (1874-1946), who succeeded his father in a leadership position among the Hināwī tribe of the Sharqiyya, seems not to have liked al-Sālimī and did not support al-Sālimī's efforts to resurrect the Omani Imamate. Al-Sālimī turned to Ḥimyar ibn Nāṣir al-Nabhānī (1874-1920), a leader of the Ghāfirī Banū Riyām in the Jabal al-Akhdar, asking him to support a former pupil of al-Sālimī's, Sālim ibn Rāshid (1884-1920), to become imam. Despite al-Sālimī's efforts, however, he did not see the re-establishment of the imamate in his lifetime.

Al-Sālimī died when his donkey stumbled as he travelled to visit one of his former teachers, Mājid ibn Khamīs al-ʿAbrī (c. 1837–1927). The two had fallen into a dispute because al-Sālimī had tried to appropriate charitable endowments intended for visiting graves and reading the Qurʾān for the dead to fund the campaign to re-establish the imamate. He was buried at Tanūf.

Works
Al-Sālimī is thought to have begun writing around the age of seventeen, swiftly gaining fame as a scholar of religion and history. Al-Sālimī composed at least twenty-two works, including Talḳīn al-ṣibyān, a book of instruction for children in Ibāḍī religion.

History of Oman

Although in his own community, al-Sālimī was most important as a religious thinker, he is best known in the West as a historian of Oman, and especially for his history of Oman, Tuḥfat al-Aʿyān bi-sīrat ahl ʿUmān, completed around 1913, shortly before his death. The work only appeared in print in 1928, edited by Abū Isḥāḳ Ibrāhīm Aṭfayyish, son of al-Sālimī's collaborator Muḥammad ibn Yūsuf Aṭfayyish (1236-1332/1820-1914), a noted Mzābi scholar and activist.

The Tuḥfat al-Aʿyān is noted for bringing together the manuscript sources composed up to al-Sālimī's time, for providing thorough citations and accurate quotations, and for being comprehensive in presenting available information about Oman; at the same time, the work is in the style of traditional Omani history-writing rather than modern history-writing. The work was influential on later scholars. On the other hand, the history has been seen as promoting al-Sālimī's ibādī politics.

Biography
Al-Sālimī's son Muḥammad continued his father's Tuḥfat al-Aʿyān down to the death of Imām Muḥammad bin ʿAbd Allāh al-Khalīlī in 1954 in a work entitled Nahḍat al-aʿyān bi-ḥurriyyat ʿUmān (published in Cairo), and in this including a long biography of al-Sālimī.

References

1914 deaths
19th-century male writers
20th-century male writers
Omani Ibadi Muslims
Date of birth unknown
Blind writers
19th-century Omani people
20th-century Omani people
Year of birth uncertain